Yuan Ze University (YZU) is a private university located in Taoyuan City, Taiwan. Established in 1989, YZU campus is in Zhongli District, Taoyuan; Taipei; and Bade District, Taoyuan.

Yuan Ze has five colleges, Engineering (accredited by IEET), Informatics, Management (accredited by AACSB and AAPBS), Humanities and Social Sciences, and Electrical and Communication Engineering (accredited by IEET). With over 8,000 students with a 2:1 ratio between undergraduate and graduate students on campus, YZU offers several international programs such as the English Program of Bachelor of Business Administration, Master’s Program in Industrial Engineering and Management. Additionally, the Master’s Programs in Communication Engineering are all taught in English.

Yuan Ze ranked 1201+ in Times Higher Education World University Rankings 2022. In 2022, the university ranked 401+ in the Times Higher Education Young University Ranking.

Presidents 

 Wang Kuo-Ming (王國明): August 1989 – July 1999
 Chan Shih-Hung (詹世弘): August 1999 – July 2005
 Perng Tsong-Pyng (彭宗平): August 2005 – July 2012
 Chang Jin-Fu (張進福): August 2012 – July 2015
 Hsu Tze-Chi (徐澤志): August 2015 – January 2016
 Wu Jyh-Yang (吳志揚): February 2016 – January 2022
 Liao Ching-Jong (廖慶榮): February 2022 – present

Recognitions and awards 

 2018   Ranked Times Higher Education Asia University top 200
 2017   Ranked QS Asia University top 210
 2016   Ranked 132, the BRICS and Emerging Economics University, Times Higher Education
 2015   Ranked QS Asia University top 250
 2014  Continuous winning for Teaching Excellence Project for 10 years
 2014   Ranked Times Higher Education Asia University top 100
 2013   Ranked 71st by the Asia University Ranking 2013, Times Higher Education
 2010   3 areas “Electrical Engineering”, “Computer  Science”, “Chemical Engineering” ranked in the top 200 in the world
 2010   One of the 11 Universities in Taiwan ranked in the top 300 in the world in the area of Computing & Technology Engineering
 2008   Teaching Excellence grant from MOE
 2008   Fuel Cell Research Center selected as a Center of Excellence by MOE
 2005   Top-University grant from MOE (Recognized as one of the top 12 universities in Taiwan)
 2004   Teaching Excellence grant from MOE

See also
 List of universities in Taiwan

References

External links 

1989 establishments in Taiwan
Educational institutions established in 1989
Universities and colleges in Taoyuan City
Zhongli District

Universities and colleges in Taiwan
Comprehensive universities in Taiwan